Al-Harith ibn Sima al-Sharabi (died 870) was the governor of Fars for the Abbasid dynasty from 869 until his death.

Career 
Al-Harith's appointment to Fars came in the aftermath of the Saffarid amir Ya'qub ibn al-Layth's recent forced entry into Shiraz, the provincial capital. Ya'qub's subsequent departure from Fars allowed the caliphal government to briefly reestablish their authority over the province, and al-Harith and other officials arrived to take control of local affairs.

Al-Harith's governorship was brief. He was soon challenged by a local Kharijite, Muhammad ibn Wasil. The two sides engaged each other in battle and al-Harith was killed; Muhammad then seized control of Fars.

References

Bibliography 
Bosworth, C. E. The History of the Saffarids of Sistan and the Maliks of Nimruz (247/861 to 949/1542-3). Costa Mesa, California: Mazda Publishers, 1994. .
Al-Tabari, Abu Ja'far Muhammad ibn Jarir. The History of al-Tabari. Ed. Ehsan Yar-Shater. 40 vols. Albany, NY: State University of New York Press, 1985-2007.
Tor, D. G. Violent Order: Religious War, Chivalry, and the 'Ayyar Phenomenon in the Medieval Islamic World. Würzburg: Ergon, 2007. .

870 deaths
Abbasid governors of Fars
Medieval Arabs killed in battle
Year of birth unknown
9th-century Arabs